Jonathan Wells (born July 21, 1979) is a former American football running back.  He played college football at Ohio State University and professionally in the National Football League (NFL) with the Houston Texans. He was drafted in the fourth round of the 2002 NFL Draft.

High school career
Wells played high school football at John Curtis Christian High School in his native River Ridge, Louisiana. He assisted the team in capturing three consecutive 4A state championships.

College career
Wells played college football with the Ohio State Buckeyes.  Despite starting only 15 of 45 career games, he carried 479 times for 2,418 yards and 27 TDs, ranking 13th on the school’s all-time rushing yards list. He was drafted in the 2002 NFL Draft by the Houston Texans.

He is most remembered by Buckeye fans for his 129 yards rushing 3 touchdown performance against Michigan, to help the Buckeyes beat the 11th-ranked Wolverines 26–20 in Jim Tressel's first year as head coach.  His effort helped snap an Ohio State six- game losing streak at Michigan Stadium, getting a win there for the first time since 1987. He was named Ohio State's 2001 season MVP. Wells was also named to the 2nd Team All Big Ten Coaches and Media Teams in 2001.

Rushing statistics

Post-football career
After his football career, Wells co-founded From the Ground Up Records with fellow NFL player, Charles Grant and Carlos Diaz. The label has signed multiple artists such as Titanium, King Kun, Gangsta Luck, and Solid (American Rapper),and Mullage who are now signed to Jive Records.

References

1979 births
Living people
American football running backs
Houston Texans players
Indianapolis Colts players
Ohio State Buckeyes football players
Players of American football from New Orleans
People from River Ridge, Louisiana